A total lunar eclipse occurred from 5:27 to 11:06 UTC on 21 December 2010, coinciding with the date of the Winter solstice in the Northern Hemisphere and Summer solstice in the Southern Hemisphere. It was visible in its entirety as a total lunar eclipse in North and South America, Iceland, Ireland, Britain and northern Scandinavia.

Occurrence
The eclipse of December 2010 was the first total lunar eclipse in almost three years, since the February 2008 lunar eclipse.

It is the second of two lunar eclipses in 2010. The first was a partial lunar eclipse on June 26, 2010.

The eclipse was the first total lunar eclipse to occur on the day of the Northern Winter Solstice (Southern Summer Solstice) since 1638, and only the second in the Common Era.

Related eclipses 

This eclipse occurred at the descending node of the moon's orbit. Lunar eclipses are always paired with a solar eclipse either 2 weeks before or after at new moon in the opposite node. In this case, it was followed by a partial solar eclipse at the ascending node on January 4, 2011, visible from Europe, northern Africa, and western Asia.

The following two lunar eclipses were also total, occurring on June 15, 2011, and December 10, 2011.
 See This lunar year cycle

The next December solstice total lunar eclipse, as a Metonic twin eclipse, will be December 20, 2029 (19 years later), one day before solstice.
 See This 19 year Metonic cycle

A saros series lasts for many centuries and has a similar event every 18 years and 11 days. This eclipse is the 18th of 26 total lunar eclipses in lunar saros series 125. The previous occurrence was on December 9, 1992, and the next will occur on December 31, 2028.
 See This saros

Visibility

In North America, the eclipse was visible in its entirety on 21 December 2010, from 12:27 a.m. to 6:06 a.m. Eastern Standard Time. In the Central Standard Time zone and west, the eclipse began the night of 20 December. Observers along South America's east coast missed the late stages of the eclipse because they occurred after moon-set.

Likewise much of Europe and Africa experienced moon-set while the eclipse was in progress. In Europe, only those observers in northern Scandinavia (including Iceland), Ireland and Britain could observe the entire event. For observers in eastern Asia the moon rose in eclipse. The eclipse was not visible from southern and eastern Africa, the Middle East or South Asia. In Japan and northeastern Asia, the eclipse's end was visible, with the moon rising at sunset. In the Philippines it was observable as a partial lunar eclipse just after sunset.

Predictions suggested that the total eclipse may appear unusually orange or red, as a result of the eruption of Mount Merapi in Indonesia on 26 October.

Local times

Photo gallery

Individual shots, sorted by time:

Animations:

Related eclipse events

Tzolkinex 
 Preceded: Lunar eclipse of November 8–9, 2003
 Followed: Lunar eclipse of January 31, 2018

Half-Saros 
 Preceded: Solar eclipse of December 14, 2001
 Followed: Solar eclipse of December 26, 2019

Tritos 
 Preceded: Lunar eclipse of January 21, 2000
 Followed: Lunar eclipse of November 19, 2021

Lunar Saros 125 
 Preceded: Lunar eclipse of December 9–10, 1992
 Followed: Lunar eclipse of December 31, 2028

Inex 
 Preceded: Lunar eclipse of January 9, 1982
 Followed: Lunar eclipse of November 30, 2039

Triad 
 Preceded: Lunar eclipse of February 20, 1924
 Followed: Lunar eclipse of October 20–21, 2097

Eclipses of 2010 
 An annular solar eclipse on 15 January.
 A partial lunar eclipse on 26 June.
 A total solar eclipse on 11 July.
 A total lunar eclipse on 21 December.

Lunar year series
The lunar year series repeats after 12 lunations or 354 days (Shifting back about 10 days in sequential years). Because of the date shift, the Earth's shadow will be about 11 degrees west in sequential events.

Metonic cycles (19 years)

Tritos series

Saros series

Half-Saros cycle
A lunar eclipse will be preceded and followed by solar eclipses by 9 years and 5.5 days (a half saros). This lunar eclipse is related to two annular solar eclipses of Solar Saros 132.

See also
List of lunar eclipses
List of 21st-century lunar eclipses
June 2011 lunar eclipse
December 2011 lunar eclipse
:File:2010-12-21 Lunar Eclipse Sketch.gif Chart
2010 12 21 – Lunar Eclipse in Jacksonville, FL
2010 12 21 – Lunar Eclipse Sequence

Notes

External links

 Worldwide viewing times for the December 2010 Total Lunar Eclipse
 How to Photograph the Lunar Eclipse from the NY Institute of Photography
 
 
 NASA: Eclipses During 2010 2010 Dec 21: Total Lunar Eclipse
 
 Animation of the December 21, 2010 eclipse at shadowandsubstance.com
 Astronomical Society of the Pacific eclipse times and questions & answers 
 

2010-12
2010 in science
December 2010 events